Kalidas Nilkanth Kolambkar is an Indian politician from Maharashtra. He is an eight-term Member of the Maharashtra Legislative Assembly. 

Kolambkar was elected from Naigaon (Vidhan Sabha constituency) as Shiv Sena candidate in 2004.  He then joined Congress and was elected from the Wadala (Vidhan Sabha constituency) of Mumbai, Maharashtra to the assembly in 2009 and 2014. Later he joined Bharatiya Janata Party, and was elected again to the assembly in 2019 from  Wadala.

References

Living people
Maharashtra MLAs 2014–2019
Shiv Sena politicians
Indian National Congress politicians
Maharashtra MLAs 2009–2014
Marathi politicians
Year of birth missing (living people)
Bharatiya Janata Party politicians from Maharashtra